Les Jarry (born 28 September 1928) is a former  Australian rules footballer who played with South Melbourne in the Victorian Football League (VFL).

Notes

External links 

Living people
1928 births
Australian rules footballers from Victoria (Australia)
Sydney Swans players